Sankoff is a surname. Notable people with the surname include:

 David Sankoff (born 1942), mathematician, bioinformatician, computer scientist and linguist
 Gillian Sankoff, sociolinguist
 Irene Sankoff, musical theatre creator